USS LST-24 was a United States Navy  used exclusively in the Asiatic-Pacific Theater during World War II and manned by a United States Coast Guard crew. Like many of her class, she was not named and is properly referred to by her hull designation.

Construction and commissioning
LST-24 was laid down on 19 November 1942, at Pittsburgh, Pennsylvania, by the Dravo Corporation; launched on 17 April 1943, sponsored by Mrs. Marguerite E. Davis, and placed in reduced commission on 3 May 1943. She was floated down the Ohio and Mississippi rivers  to New Orleans, Louisiana, for her fitting out; and fully commissioned on 14 June 1943.

Service history
LST-24 sailed from Galveston, Texas, on 29 July 1943, with Convoy HK 113 heading for Key West, Florida, where she arrived on 2 August 1943.

LST-24 operated in the New Georgia area from 1 to 6 February 1944, and in the Guadalcanal area from 7 to 28 February, that same year. In the latter area she was engaged in transporting cargo and personnel in the Russell Islands and Solomon Islands. On 4 April 1944, she was at Tutila, Samoa.

She participated in the capture and occupation of Guam during August 1944. She returned to Finschhaven on 11 September, and then went on to participate in the Western New Guinea campaign. She landed troops and equipment during the Morotai landings in September 1944, and then at the Leyte landings in the Philippines, participating in General Douglas MacArthur's promised liberation of the islands from the Japanese occupation, through October and November 1944. LST-24 was also at the Battle of Luzon Lingayen Gulf landings in January 1945. Proceeding by the way of Russell Islands and Guadalcanal, LST-24 reached Ulithi on 25 February 1945, and then Manila. She departed Manila on 21 March, stopping at Tacloban and arrived at Hollandia on 24 March 1945. She then went on to participate in the assault and occupation of Okinawa Gunto from March through June 1945.

LST-24 finished her combat career with the assault and occupation of Okinawa Gunto from the end of March until 24 June 1945, when she departed for San Francisco via Pearl Harbor, arriving there on 9 December 1945. From there she proceeded to Galveston via San Diego and the Canal Zone.

Postwar career
She was decommissioned and her Coast Guard crew removed on 16 February 1946. She was struck from the Navy list on 5 June 1946. On 23 December 1947, she was sold to the Humble Oil & Refining Co., of Houston, Texas, and was converted for merchant service.

Honors and awards
LST-24 earned five battle stars for her World War II service.

References

Bibliography

External links

 

LST-1-class tank landing ships of the United States Navy
World War II amphibious warfare vessels of the United States
Ships built in Pittsburgh
1943 ships
United States Navy ships crewed by the United States Coast Guard
Ships built by Dravo Corporation